Wattenburg or Wattenberg is an unincorporated community located in Weld County, Colorado, United States.  The U.S. Post Office at Fort Lupton (ZIP code 80621) now serves Wattenburg postal addresses.

Geography 
Wattenburg is located at  (40.116284,-104.798069).

References 

Unincorporated communities in Weld County, Colorado
Unincorporated communities in Colorado